Half-foot was a kind of land tenure peculiar to northern and western Scotland.

The possessor, generally impoverished, or without facilities for working the land, often furnished the land and seed corn, and the tenant cultivated it, the produce being equally divided between them. There have been instances of it in the 20th century.

Other uses: 
 A certain stage in the drying of peats.
 Part of a hand line

See also
 Crofting
 Township (Scotland)
 Aoghairean

References
  leth-chois, leth-chas
 Clan Donald, iii

Agriculture in Scotland
Scots law
Real property law
Land tenure